Nocturnal Opera is an album released by Moi dix Mois on July 20, 2004.  It was also released in Europe as a 2CD digipack, with the other CD containing a collection of the singles released by Moi dix Mois. A 2CD Jewel Case was also released in Europe.

Track listing
 "Invite to Immorality"
 "Nocturnal Romance"
 "Monophobia"
 "Vestige"
 "Vizard"
 "Mephisto Waltz"
 "Mad Ingrain"
 "The Prophet"
 "Perish"
 "Shadows Temple"
 "Silent Omen"

All songs written by Mana.

Personnel
 Yuichiro Goto – violin on 3, 4
 Yuki Ishimaru – violin on 10
 Youko Takai – soprano chorus on 2, 3, 8
 Risa – chorus on 3, 4, 8

2004 albums
Moi dix Mois albums